Hưng Thịnh is a commune in Hưng Nguyên District, Nghệ An province, Vietnam.

In 2008, the estimated population was 4,102, and the population density was 941 people/km².

References

Districts of Nghệ An province